Jiangsu Ocean University, also known as Huaihai Institute of Technology (abbreviated HHIT), is an institute in Lianyungang, Jiangsu, China.

History 
In 1985, Huaihai University (Being Organizing) was established as an element of the Provincial Seventh Five-year plan. The organizing was hosted by Jiangsu Provincial Government, Nanjing University, Southeast University, Soochow University and Nanjing Normal University. totally twelve universities and colleges offered aid. The institute transformed into Huaihai Institute of Technology in 1990 without national sanction.

The institute successively incorporated Jiangsu Salt Industry School, Lianyungang Fisheries Schooland Lianyungang Chemical Industry Academy in May 1998, January 2000 and August 2002, respectively.

The institute was permit to grant bachelor's degree since 1993.

On 12 June 2019, Huaihai Institute of Technology officially changed its name to Jiangsu Ocean University.

References

External links

Universities and colleges in Jiangsu
Technical universities and colleges in China